The Pashalik of Scutari, Iskodra, or Shkodra (1757–1831), was an autonomous and de facto independent pashalik  created by the Albanian Bushati family from the previous Sanjak of Scutari, which was situated around the city of Shkodër in modern-day Albania and large majority of modern-day Montenegro. At its peak during the reign of Kara Mahmud Bushati the pashalik encompassed much of Albania, most of Kosovo, western Macedonia, southeastern Serbia and most of Montenegro. Up to 1830 the Pashalik of Shkodra controlled most of the above lands including Southern Montenegro.

Background
The weakening of Ottoman central authority and the timar system of land ownership brought anarchy to the Albanian-populated region of the Ottoman empire. In the late eighteenth century, two Albanian centers of power emerged: Shkodër, under the Bushati family; and Janina, under Ali Pasha of Tepelenë. Both regions cooperated with and defied the Sublime Porte as their interests required.

History
In 1757, Mehmed Bushati, having eliminated two rival families and heading the Tabak esnaf of Shkodra as their spiritual Sheikh proclaimed himself pasha of Shkodër. Mehmet Bushati known as Mehmet the Old (Plaku) transformed the Sanjak of Scutari, created in 1479, into a semi-autonomous Pashalik of Shkodra. He was praised by Istanbul for ending the Arab and Berber pirates' reign of terror over the Venetian ships in the Adriatic.

Mehmed Bushati's son and third successor, Kara Mahmud Bushati, pursued a policy of military expansion and established his control over northern Albania up to the Toskëria and Kosovo. He launched two attacks on Montenegro (1785, 1796) and against Venice in revenge for the Bey of Tunis. He defeated several Ottoman expeditions dispatched to subdue him for his uncontrolled behavior. Kara Mahmud subdued Montenegrin tribes and forced the Venetians to pay him a tribute (haraç). He courted both the Austrian and Russian empires, receiving a promise from Vienna that they would recognise him as lord of all Albania in return for an alliance against the Sublime Porte. However, after taking money from the Austrians he decapited the Viennese emissaries, sent their heads to Istanbul and pledged loyalty to the sultan. In response, the Ottomans ex post facto pardoned Kara Mahmud for his attacks against Venice and reappointed him governor of Shkodër.

In 1796, the Montenegrin tribes of Piperi and Bjelopavlići defeated an expedition launched against them by the Shkodran Muslims in the Battle of Krusi and decapitated Kara Mahmud Bushati. His death signalled a decline in autonomy for the pashalik. Kara Mahmud's successor Ibrahim Bushati cooperated with the Ottoman empire until his own death (1810). He was appointed Beylerbey of Rumelia and subdued the Serbs during his military expeditions against Belgrade.

The Bushati dynasty's rule came to an end when an Ottoman army under Mehmed Reshid Pasha laid siege to the Rozafa castle at Shkodër and forced the surrender of the last pasha Mustafa Bushati who had rebelled against the sultan whom they accused as Kaurr – infidel (1831). This defeat not only ended a planned alliance between the Albanians and the Bosnians, who were similarly seeking autonomy, but also brought about the dissolution of the pashalik.

Aftermath 
In 1867, the Sanjak of Scutari merged with the Sanjak of Üsküb (Skopje), forming the Scutari Vilayet. The vilayet was subsequently divided into three sanjaks: İșkodra (Scutari), Prizren and Dibra. In 1877, the Sanjak of Prizren was transferred to the Kosovo Vilayet, and the Sanjak of Dibra was transferred to the Monastir Vilayet. Following the territorial transfers, the Sanjak of Scutari was subsequently divided into two sanjaks: Sanjak of Scutari and Sanjak of Draç (Durrës).

Pashas
Mehmed Bushati                   (1757–1774)
Mustafa Bushati                  (1774–1778)
Kara Mahmud Bushati              (1778–1796)
Ibrahim Bushati                  (1796–1810)
Mustafa Sherifi               (1810-1831)

See also
Pashalik of Janina
Albania under Ottoman Empire
Albanian Pashaliks
List of Sunni Muslim dynasties

References

Bibliography

Former countries in the Balkans
Vassal states of the Ottoman Empire
Ottoman Albania
Ottoman period in the history of Kosovo
Ottoman period in the history of Montenegro